I Love You, Man is a 2009 American bromantic comedy film written and directed by John Hamburg, based on a script by Larry Levin. The film stars Paul Rudd as a friendless man looking for a best man for his upcoming wedding. However, his new best friend (Jason Segel) is straining his relationship with his bride (Rashida Jones).

The film was released theatrically in the United States on March 20, 2009, to mostly positive reviews. The film grossed $92 million on a $40 million budget. It marked the third collaboration between Segel and Rudd, after Knocked Up (2007) and Forgetting Sarah Marshall (2008).

Plot
Peter Klaven, a Los Angeles real estate agent, proposes to his girlfriend Zooey Rice, and she accepts. He doesn't have any close male friends to share the news with, only family and mainly female acquaintances. After overhearing her friends' concern over his lack of guy friends, Peter decides he needs to find some to have a best man for the wedding.

Peter turns to his gay younger brother, Robbie, for advice on meeting men. He makes a series of overtures toward various men, including Barry, the persistently hot-headed husband of Zooey's friend Denise. Barry doesn't like Peter too much—a problem which only escalates when Peter, after winning a beer-drinking contest, inadvertently projectile-vomits on Barry.

Feeling rejected, Peter is about to give up when, at an open house at Lou Ferrigno's mansion which he is trying to sell, he meets Sydney Fife, an investor who is attending the show to pick up divorced women and take advantage of the free food. They quickly become friends, bonding over their mutual adoration of the progressive rock band Rush. Peter introduces Sydney to Zooey at their engagement party, but unfortunately a nervous Sydney makes a very awkward toast which includes veiled encouragement for Zooey to perform oral sex on Peter more often.

The next night, Peter attends a Rush concert with Sydney, on the condition that he bring Zooey. During the concert, she feels ignored by them. The next day, while shopping for tuxedos, Sydney asks Peter why he is marrying Zooey, and also asks for an $8,000 loan. After some thought, Peter decides to lend Sydney the money, and later asks him to be his best man. Zooey, meanwhile, has become suspicious of Sydney. Peter tells her that he lent Sydney money and asks her if she knows why they are getting married, since he had no answer to Sydney's question (not aware the question was supposed to stay between him and Sydney). Hurt and angry, Zooey leaves.

Peter goes to work the next morning, discovering Sydney has used the $8,000 loan to purchase several ridiculous billboard advertisements promoting Peter's real estate business (with photos of Peter he had taken). Still upset over his fight with Zooey, he confronts Sydney and ends their friendship. Peter then patches things up with Zooey, explaining that although he is nervous, he is ready to get married. As they prepare for the wedding, Sydney finds himself alone and desperate to hang out with someone.

At work, Peter discovers that Sydney's billboard advertising campaign was successful. He won back the right to the lucrative Ferrigno listing and many others left messages, wanting him to sell their houses. Feeling encouraged, Peter finally stands up to his insufferable colleague, Tevin Downey, who had been badgering Peter for half the selling rights to the Ferrigno property. When he makes one final attempt to get a piece of it, Peter slaps him, telling him to back off.

Peter feels bad about fighting with Sydney but does not re-invite him to the wedding. Instead, he assembles an array of random groomsmen that includes Robbie, their father Oswald, and Ferrigno. Before the wedding, Zooey sees Peter looking forlorn, clearly missing Sydney. She calls and invites Sydney, who is, unbeknownst to them, already en route to the wedding. 

Just before the vows are to be taken, Sydney makes a dramatic entrance via Vespa. He reminds Peter and Zooey that he is, in fact, a successful investor and returns the money he borrowed from Peter, announcing the billboards were their wedding present. Peter and Zooey declare their love to each other, Sydney assumes the role of best man, and the wedding continues.

As the credits roll, we see the wedding reception, where Peter and Sydney join the hired band (played by OK Go) in a rendition of the Rush song "Limelight" and pull Zooey on stage to join them. As the song ends, Sydney attempts to toast the newlyweds and Peter runs to frantically stop him as the screen cuts out (remembering Sydney's ill-advised toast at the engagement dinner).

Cast

Production

The script, Let's Be Friends, was originally written by Larry Levin. It was purchased but went unused for about 11 years before the film was made. Hamburg was offered the script and kept turning it down, but after his friends moved to Los Angeles he was inspired by the experience of trying to meet more friends to give it a shot. When Hamburg finally took the script he rewrote it to make it as real as possible. The film was originally announced in December 2007, with production originally scheduled for March 2008. In March 2008, Variety revealed that producer Ivan Reitman's Montecito Picture Company officially began production on I Love You, Man during the week of March 31, 2008.

Casting
I Love You, Man is the third collaboration between Paul Rudd and Jason Segel, following the Judd Apatow projects Knocked Up and Forgetting Sarah Marshall, while writer/director John Hamburg previously worked with Segel on Apatow's Undeclared television series. It only took one lunch to get Segel and Rudd to sign on to do the film and this set the stage for other actors to sign on. On February 13, 2008 it was announced that Rashida Jones would be the female lead opposite Rudd. Later, in an interview with FirstShowing.net, Jones revealed that because Segel and Rudd were already attached to the project she "knew immediately that it was gonna be even funnier than I would think." At the beginning of the March 31, 2008 week, The Hollywood Reporter announced that Jaime Pressly had joined the film's cast, playing the best friend of Rashida Jones' character. Hamburg comically stated that he was lucky in casting J.K. Simmons because his contract states "he has to be in one out of every four movies made." Jon Favreau started working on the film the same week Iron Man came out, a film which he directed. He said he "probably wouldn't have agreed to have done it had I known my life was going to be that shape", but Iron Man star Robert Downey Jr. told him that "It is the best thing you could do" – he said 'chop wood, carry water,' which is what they do in the Kung Fu movies to keep you humble."

Anwar Sadat
One of late President of Egypt Anwar Sadat's daughters filed a lawsuit against the filmmakers because, in the film, Sydney's dog is named after her father. He tells Peter that he thinks "they look exactly alike." Samir Sabri, the lawyer in the case, asked the US embassy to apologize. Complaints have been raised by Egyptian bloggers as well. In the Arab world, "dog" is often used as an insult, and, in the more specific context of Islam, dogs have historically been seen as unclean.

Rush
Rush was approached by Hamburg, a fan of the band, to appear in the film. The filming schedule was tight because there was a one-day window between two of their concerts on tour. The band later said that they enjoyed the experience. Hamburg felt that "once Rush got that I wasn't poking fun at them, that I'm genuinely a fan and the main characters of the movie are fans and it's kind of a loving tribute to them, I think that's when they came on board." Subsequently, both Rudd and Segel appeared in character as Peter and Sydney alongside the members of Rush in a short video played at the end of concerts during the band's 2010–11 Time Machine Tour. In August 2013, Rudd reprised his character at the final show of Rush's Clockwork Angels Tour, conducting the Clockwork Angels Orchestra (a string section which accompanied the band) during the song "YYZ." In 2015, on Rush's R40 Live Tour, Rudd and Segel were again featured among a number of celebrities in an accompanying rear-screen video lip-synching the rap section to the song "Roll the Bones".

Reception

Critical response

On Rotten Tomatoes the film has an approval rating of 83% based on 207 reviews, with an average rating of 6.9/10. The website's critical consensus states, "I Love You, Man makes the most of its simple premise due to the heartfelt and hilarious performances of Paul Rudd and Jason Segel." On Metacritic the film has a weighted average score of 70 out of 100, based on 34 critics, indicating "generally favorable reviews". Audiences surveyed by CinemaScore gave the film an average grade of "B+" on scale of A+ to F.

Giving the film three out of four stars, Peter Travers of Rolling Stone said that despite the formulaic plot, "the right actors can keep it afloat, even airborne." He also praised the supporting cast. Entertainment Weekly gave the film an C−, and said that "Paul Rudd gives a startlingly funny and original performance." USA Today gave the film a glowing review, stating "the movie works because everything hinges on the camaraderie and undeniable chemistry between Rudd and Segel." More conservatively, People magazine said the movie "sails along on goodwill and blush-worthy bawdiness," but concluded that "like instant chocolate pudding, it goes down easy — even if it isn't especially good for you."

The film was not without its critics. Peter Rainer of The Christian Science Monitor was not impressed with the film, and after noting that the character Sydney seemed to be written for Owen Wilson, Rainer remarked, "Maybe Wilson was busy. Lucky him." The Colorado Daily described the relationship between the male leads as a "watered-down false bromance", noting that the pace of their relationship seemed "rushed", and that Peter was looking out for his wife rather than his best friend.

Box office

In its U.S. opening weekend, the film made $17.8 million in 2,711 theaters, ranking number two at the box office. I Love You, Man stayed in the box office top ten for five weeks and was number 27 among films released in 2009. The film grossed $71.4 million domestically and $20.2 million internationally making $93.4 million worldwide.

Home media 
The film was released on Blu-ray and DVD by Paramount Home Entertainment on August 11, 2009 in the US and August 24, 2009 in Europe and as of November 2009 generated more than $22 million in DVD sales. I Love You, Man was ranked number two in sales during its opening week and declined from there. The DVD extras contains an hour and a half of content including a full performance of "Limelight".

Awards
 
The film has been nominated for Best Kiss for the 2009 MTV Movie Awards for the smooch between Thomas Lennon's character Doug and Rudd's Peter, but lost to Twilight. It was also nominated for a GLAAD Media Award for "Outstanding Film – Wide Release" during the 21st GLAAD Media Awards.

Soundtrack

References

External links

 
 
I Love You, Man at Rottoen Tomatoes

2009 films
2000s buddy comedy films
American buddy comedy films
2000s English-language films
DreamWorks Pictures films
The Montecito Picture Company films
Films about weddings
Films directed by John Hamburg
Films with screenplays by John Hamburg
Films produced by Donald De Line
Films scored by Theodore Shapiro
Paramount Pictures films
2009 comedy films
2000s American films